The seventh season of the American comedy television series It's Always Sunny in Philadelphia, premiered on FX on September 15, 2011. The season contains 13 episodes, and concluded airing on December 15, 2011.

Season synopsis
Frank falls in love with a prostitute named Roxy which sets the rest of the gang off to try and transform her into a presentable woman. Meanwhile, Dennis attempts to help Mac get healthy after gaining nearly fifty pounds. The gang decides to take a road trip to the Jersey Shore so Dennis and Dee can relive their favorite childhood memories. The vacation turns nightmarish for the siblings, while Frank, Mac, and Charlie have magical experiences. Frank accidentally finds himself in charge of a child beauty pageant and tries to squash all suspicions that he is a pedophile while the rest of the gang pick contestants to mentor.

When Dee comes into money from her surrogate pregnancy, she is forced to fake a baby funeral to avoid paying taxes to the IRS. The boys in the gang attempt to start a more democratic way of running Paddy's Pub, which ultimately results in more shouting. Frank's long lost brother shows up at Paddy's, revealing secrets about Frank's former life as a club owner, drug addict, and about Frank's former lover. The gang runs into trouble when they try to prepare for a giant storm, and Dennis meets a woman he can't seduce.

On a slow news day the gang plays a board game they invented (ripped off from other games) called "Chardee MacDennis". The gang tries to track down an annoying shusher on Facebook and end up bickering about the use of the Internet for Paddy's business. While robbing a house, the gang gets caught in a precarious situation when the homeowners return.

Mac confesses to a priest how he gained his weight, and why the blame falls on his friends. The gang rush to the movie theater to see the world's greatest action movie, but must avoid traffic caused by President Obama's trip to Philly. The gang attend their high school reunion and are humiliated by the "cool kids" and other former enemies. They then take revenge on their enemies in the form of a dance routine.

Cast

Main cast 
 Charlie Day as Charlie Kelly
 Glenn Howerton as Dennis Reynolds
 Rob McElhenney as Mac
 Kaitlin Olson as Dee Reynolds
 Danny DeVito as Frank Reynolds

Recurring cast 
 Mary Elizabeth Ellis as The Waitress
 David Hornsby as Cricket
 Artemis Pebdani as Artemis
 Catherine Reitman as Maureen Ponderosa

Guest stars 
 Kristina Apgar as Catherine
 Jon Polito as Gino Reynolds
 Naturi Naughton as Shadynasty
 Lance Reddick as Reggie
 Jessica Collins as Jackie Denardo
 Luenell as Catfish
 W. Morgan Sheppard as Father Cullen
 Sasha Roiz as Adriano Calvanese
 Nick Wechsler as Brad
 Caleb Followill as Man at Bar
 Nathan Followill as Bartender #1
 Jared Followill as Bartender #2
 Judy Greer as Ingrid "Fatty Magoo" Nelson
 Jason Sudeikis as Schmitty

Episodes

Reception
The seventh season received positive reviews. On Rotten Tomatoes, it has an approval rating of 100% with an average score of 8.5 out of 10 based on 13 reviews. The website's critical consensus reads, "Rob McElhenney's Mac gets slovenly, but It's Always Sunny shows no signs of resting on its laurels with a seventh season that charts a hilariously disastrous course from the Jersey Shore to the Gang's high school reunion."

Home media

References

External links 

 
 

2011 American television seasons
It's Always Sunny in Philadelphia
Class reunions in popular culture

it:Episodi di C'è sempre il sole a Philadelphia (sesta stagione)